For Three Strings and Orchestra is the third album by the Arcado String Trio (violinist Mark Feldman, cellist Hank Roberts and bassist Mark Dresser) featuring the Kölner Rundfunk Orchester which was recorded in 1991 and released on the JMT label.

Reception
AllMusic awarded the album 3 stars.

Track listing
 "For Not the Law" (Mark Dresser) - 17:18
 "It's a Free Country, Isn't It?" (Hank Roberts) - 15:04   
 "In Cold Moonlight" (Manfred Niehaus) - 12:06   
 "Naked Singularities" (Mark Feldman) - 21:51

Personnel
Mark Feldman - violin
Hank Roberts - cello
Mark Dresser - bass
Kölner Rundfunk Orchester conducted by David de Villiers

References 

1991 albums
Mark Feldman albums
Hank Roberts albums
Mark Dresser albums
JMT Records albums
Winter & Winter Records albums